Kambal Tuko is a 1988 Filipino fantasy comedy film directed by J. Erastheo Navoa, written by Jose N. Carreon, and starring Susan Roces, Eddie Gutierrez, and twin child actors Richard and Raymond Gutierrez. Produced by Regal Films, the film was released on April 14, 1988. Critic Luciano Soriano of the Manila Standard gave Kambal Tuko a negative review, criticizing its fantastical elements and excessive number of characters as preventing the film from telling a potentially interesting story.

Cast
Susan Roces as Mely
Eddie Gutierrez as Andoy
Richard Gutierrez as Kokoy
Raymond Gutierrez as Totoy
Jenny Lyn as Jenny
Isabel Granada as Isabel
Fatima Alvir as Fatima
Chuckie Dreyfuss as Chuckie
Raffy Romillo as Raffy
Brylle Mondejar as Sammy
Palito as Papay
Cecille Iñigo as Olive
Max Alvarado as Father To Pak
Manolet Ripoll as Manolet
Philip Henson as Philip
Mark Anthony as Mark
Bernard Allan as Bernard
Dencio Padilla as Mr. Dennis Labis
Rudy Meyer as Entoy, a hunchback
Bomber Moran as Boy Macho
Larry Silva as Boy Kinis
Boy Alano as Boy Unano
Joaquin Fajardo (Jake Fajardo) as Boy Guapo
Bing Angeles as feria bossman
Ike Lozada as radio announcer
Flora Gasser as Madame Koping, a psychic
Lucy Quinto as Nana Paste
Cris Dalus as an "albularyo"
Coring Obnamia as an "albularyo"
Tom Alvares as Tom
Jun Visconde as Jun
Dondie Contreras as Dondie
Khess Kortes as teacher
Leo Timones Jr. as Tabachoy
Evelyn Vargas as Fruitella and a witch
Minnie Aguilar as Orchidella and a witch
Beverly Salviejo as Pinakbet and a witch

Release
Kambal Tuko was released in the Philippines on April 14, 1988, with a ₱100,000 prize for viewers who could correctly identify both of the twin child actors.

Critical response
Luciano E. Soriano, writing for the Manila Standard, gave Kambal Tuko a negative review. He criticized its fantastical elements and excessive number of colorful characters as unnecessary, as he thought that the main premise of a family dealing with real-life issues in raising conjoined twins has potential to be a good story on its own.

References

External links

1988 films
1980s fantasy comedy films
1988 comedy films
Fictional conjoined twins
Filipino-language films
Films shot in Metro Manila
Philippine fantasy comedy films